This is a list of opinion polling results for the 2013 German federal election, held on 22 September 2013.

Final results of the election had the CDU/CSU score 41.5% of the vote, their best result since tallying 47% in the 1990 election, but nonetheless five seats short of an absolute majority. The CDU/CSU's junior partner in the outgoing coalition, the FDP, failed to pass the 5% threshold and will therefore go without representation for the first time in the party's history. The SPD and Greens (red-green coalition), partners in the 1998–2005 Schröder governments, also fell short of the number of votes to get a majority. With neither coalition obtaining a majority on its own a grand coalition was formed by the CDU/CSU with the SPD due to the FDP's failure to obtain the minimum of 5% of votes required to enter parliament. This coalition was similar to the 2005-2009 Merkel government.

Graphical summary 

The chart shows the relative state of the parties from October 2009 to the September 2013 election.

Party polling

Preferred Chancellor 
Polling since Peer Steinbrück was chosen as Kanzlerkandidat for the SPD on 28 September 2012.

Prior polling

Preferred coalition

See also 
Opinion polling for the 2017 German federal election
Opinion polling for the 2021 German federal election

References

External links 
 Spiegel Online Poll Barometer
 Opinion poll tracker with data, graph and daily average (in English)
 Opinion poll tracker with data
 Opinion poll tracker with graph and weekly average

2013
2013 elections in Germany